Murchison is a locality in the Mid West region of Western Australia.

Demographics
The median age of persons in Murchison was 44 years. There were less males than females, with 46.9% of the population male and 53.1% female. The average household size was 2 people per household.

References 

Towns in Western Australia
Mid West (Western Australia)